Saghata is an upazila of Gaibandha District in the Division of Rangpur, Bangladesh.
Village=shimultair 
Post=Bonarpara

Geography
Saghata is located at Rangpur division . It has 43474 households and total area 225.67 km2.

Demographics
As of the 1991 Bangladesh census, Shaghata has a population of 232118. Males constitute 50.73% of the population, and females 49.27%. This Upazila's eighteen up population is 105508. Sughatta has an average literacy rate of 22.1% (7+ years), and the national average of 32.4% literate.

Language
Most people of Saghata speak Bengali dialect of Rangpur region with some similar accents of Bogra region. Many people of Char region, specially of the far eastern char areas, speak the dialect of Mymensingh.

Administration
Saghata Upazila is divided into ten union parishads: Bonarpara, Ghuridah, Holdia, Jumarbari, Kachua, Kamalerpara, Muktinagar, Padumsahar, Saghata, and Varotkhali. The union parishads are subdivided into 117 mauzas and 130 villages.

Notaable residents 
 Ahmed Hossain(Ex. Minister of Undivided Bengal). 
 Advocate Fazle Rabbi Miah(Deputy speaker).
Dr. Mizanur Rahman (Ex. Chairman of Human rights Commission). 
Mahmud Hasan Ripon(Ex. President of Bangladesh Chattra League).

See also
Upazilas of Bangladesh
Districts of Bangladesh
Divisions of Bangladesh

References

Upazilas of Gaibandha District